The 2004–05 National Division One was the 18th full season of rugby union within the second tier of the English league system, currently known as the RFU Championship. New teams to the division included Rotherham Titans who were demoted from the 2003-04 Zurich Premiership while Sedgley Park and Nottingham were promoted from the 2003–04 National Division Two.  Rotherham almost went into liquidation and dropped out of the leagues following their relegation from the Premiership but were saved by a local consortium which enabled them to continue playing in National One.  As well as new teams Coventry had a new ground, moving from Coundon Road to the smaller but more modern Butts Park Arena.

By the end of the season, after two seasons spent in the division, Bristol Shoguns became champions and were promoted back to the Guinness Premiership for season 2005–06.  Exeter Chiefs were runners–up, and Orrell (last seasons runners–up) along with Henley were relegated to the 2005–06 National Division Two.

Participating teams

Table

Results

Round 1 

Postponed.  Game rescheduled to 12 February 2005.

Round 2

Round 3

Round 4

Round 5

Round 6

Round 7 

Despite earlier winning the game 22-15 Coventry were in breach of RFU principal regulation 11.4 and the Titans were awarded the win.

Round 8 

Postponed.  Game rescheduled to 5 March 2005.

Round 9

Round 10

Round 11

Round 12

Round 13 

Postponed.  Game rescheduled to 5 February 2005.

Postponed.  Game rescheduled to 5 February 2005.

Round 14 

Postponed.  Game rescheduled to 12 February 2005.

Postponed.  Game rescheduled to 12 February 2005.

Round 15

Round 16

Round 17 

Postponed.  Game rescheduled to 19 March 2005.

Round 18

Round 13 (rescheduled games)

Round 1 & 14 (rescheduled games)

Round 19

Round 20

Round 8 (rescheduled game)

Round 21

Round 17 (rescheduled game)

Round 22

Round 23

Round 24

Round 25

Round 26

Total Season Attendances

Individual statistics 

 Note that points scorers includes tries as well as conversions, penalties and drop goals.

Top points scorers

Top try scorers

Season records

Team
Largest home win — 53 pts (x2)
62 - 9 Bristol Shoguns at home to Sedgley Park on 16 January 2005
68 - 15 Bristol Shoguns at home to Exeter Chiefs on 27 March 2005
Largest away win — 48 pts
53 - 5 Bristol Shoguns away to Orrell on 9 April 2005
Most points scored — 68 pts
68 - 15 Bristol Shoguns at home to Exeter Chiefs on 27 March 2005
Most tries in a match — 10
Bristol Shoguns away to Nottingham on 2 October 2005
Most conversions in a match — 8 (x2)
Rotherham Titans at home to Orrell on 18 September 2004
Bristol Shoguns at home to Sedgley Park on 16 January 2005
Most penalties in a match — 9
Coventry at home to Otley on 13 November 2004
Most drop goals in a match — 2
Bristol Shoguns at home to London Welsh on 12 September 2004

Player
Most points in a match — 27 (x2)
 Ramiro Pez for Rotherham Titans at home to Orrell on 18 September 2004
 Matthew Leek for Coventry at home to Otley on 13 November 2004
Most tries in a match — 4 (x2)
 Dan Ward-Smith for Plymouth Albion at home to Coventry on 9 October 2004
 Sean Marsden for Bristol Shoguns away to Orrell on 9 April 2005
Most conversions in a match — 8 
 Ramiro Pez for Rotherham Titans at home to Orrell on 18 September 2004
Most penalties in a match —  9
 Matthew Leek for Coventry at home to Otley on 13 November 2004
Most drop goals in a match —  1
N/A - multiple players

Attendances

Highest — 10,349 
Bristol Shoguns at home to Exeter Chiefs on 27 March 2005
Lowest — 237 
Orrell at home to Plymouth Albion on 12 March 2005
Highest Average Attendance — 5,234
Bristol Shoguns
Lowest Average Attendance — 360 	
Orrell

See also 
 English rugby union system

References

2004–05 in English rugby union leagues
2004-05